The Journal of Mathematical Logic was established in 2001 and is published by World Scientific. It covers the field of mathematical logic and its applications.

Abstracting and indexing 
The journal is abstracted and indexed in:
 Current Mathematical Publications
 Mathematical Reviews
 MathSciNet
 Zentralblatt MATH
 Science Citation Index Expanded
 Current Contents/Physical, Chemical and Earth Sciences
 Journal Citation Reports/Science Edition

External links 
 

English-language journals
Publications established in 2001
Mathematics journals
World Scientific academic journals
Logic journals